Astichopus is a monotypic genus of sea cucumbers, the only species in the genus being Astichopus multifidus. It is commonly known as the furry sea cucumber or the fissured sea cucumber and is native to the Caribbean Sea.

Description
This sea cucumber is chocolate brown or dark grey, sometimes mottled with paler patches or speckled with many small white spots.

Distribution and habitat
Astichopus multifidus is native to the Caribbean region. Its range includes the West Indies, the southern tip of Florida, the Dry Tortugas and the region of the Campeche Bank and southwards to Colombia and Venezuela.

Biology
Astichopus multifidus spends the day buried in the sand, emerging at night to feed. It is a scavenger and detritivore and ingests large quantities of sediment from which organic matter is extracted as it passes through its gut. It can move much more rapidly than most sea cucumbers and can cover almost 2 m (6 ft) in a minute. Locomotion is mostly by crawling or rolling, but fast progress can be made by "bounding".

Status
The IUCN has rated Astichopus multifidus as being of "Least Concern". Other species of sea cucumber found in the Caribbean have been more heavily exploited than this species, but as stocks get depleted, it can be expected to be increasingly targeted. The population trend of Astichopus multifidus is unknown but its range includes some protected areas, and the gathering of sea cucumbers is illegal in Panama, Costa Rica and Venezuela.

References

External links
 

Fauna of the Caribbean
Stichopodidae
Monotypic echinoderm genera
Taxa named by Hubert Lyman Clark
Animals described in 1910